Fazal Haq Khaliqyar (1934 – 16 July 2004) was an Afghan politician, who briefly served as the Chairman of the Council of Ministers of the Republic of Afghanistan.

He performed duties as deputy Minister of Finance during Mohammad Daud Khan's rule. He was appointed as Council of Ministers chairman during the period of President Mohammad Najibullah government. For the first time since 1978, a free parliamentary debate was held in order to select the Council of Ministers chairman. On May 21, 1990, Khaliqyar, who was non-party figure, was selected to this position. He replaced PDPA hard-liner Keshtmand. However, Khaliqyar's cabinet kept PDPA stalwarts in all the key security posts.

By the end of May 1990, A loya jirga was convened in Kabul, which ratified constitutional amendments providing for multiple political parties, ending the PDPA's and the National Front's monopoly over executive power. On December 11, 1990, President Najibullah inaugurated a National Commission for Clearing Mines and Unexploded Ordnance from the Lands of the Republic of Afghanistan under the chairmanship of Khaliqyar.

A Moscow-brokered plan called for Najibullah to step aside in favour of Khaliqyar, who would serve as a transitional administrative leader until a new government could be elected. In October, Mujaddidi praised Khaliqyar's government and said that he would consult his more radical colleagues on sharing power with him in a transitional government.

Later he backed off from this pledge due to pressure from hard-liners. The Mujaheddin said his association with Najibullah made him unacceptable for any compromise. His government ended with the fall of Najibullah in April 1992, led by the transition of power towards the Mujaheddin. On July 16, 2004, Khaliqyar died in Netherlands at the age of 70.

Cabinet

References 

1934 births
2004 deaths
Afghan Muslims
Prime Ministers of Afghanistan
People's Democratic Party of Afghanistan politicians
Afghan Tajik people